Ban Phou Pheung Noi (Lao: ບ້ານພູເຟືອງນ້ອຍ) is a Laotian village located at the peak of Phou Pheung mountain in the Xieng Khouang province of Laos. During the Vietnam War, combat between the American allies, the Hmong, and the Pathet Lao, The Laos Marxist government, and the Communist North Vietnamese People's Army took place on the mountain. Phou Pheung mountain runs from east to west and is rocky, and is covered in tropical forests. It is south of Muang Soui - Nongtang-Nato, and west of Phou Douk, Muang Phuan, Phonsavan and Plain of Jars. To the east, about 10 miles from Ban Phou Pheung Noi, is the Num Ngum 4 hydroelectric dam.

Down from the village of Ban Phou Pheung Noi are rocky mountains and the Nam Ngum River, which ran west to the Mekong River in Vientiane province. During the rainy season, navigation between Ban Phou Pheung Noi and its neighbors across the river is almost impossible due to rocky cliffs on both banks of the river. To reach the other side of the river, it is necessary to go miles on foot, which could only be attempted during the dry season.

Etymology 
Phou means "mount", pheung is "peak", and noi means small. Ban means "village".

History 
Ban Phou Pheung Noi became known in the 1950s. From 1945 to 1970, two hill tribes lived at the top of the mountain. The first group of inhabitants were Khmu people Lao Theung, an indigenous group from Laos. The others were Hmong people (previously called Miao people), who migrated from South China and North Vietnam in the 18th century. Between 1952 and 1965, the Hmong hill tribes mainly lived in Ban Phou Pheung Noi, hunting, fishing, and burning the rainforest to clear land. They grew corn, rice, and opium poppies. The site of Ban Phou Pheung Noi was covered by dense forest.

When Captain Kong Le overthrew the Royal Lao Government on August 10, 1960 in a coup d'état, Ban Phou Pheung Noi villagers took refuge in a cave on a cliff of Phou pheung mountain on the bank of the Nam Ngum River out of fear of being killed by Kong Le's military troops moving east through Muang Soui to Phonsavan and Plain of Jars. This was how the war began in Laos.

The first American helicopter of the Vietnam War landed in Ban Phou Pheung Noi in 1961. When the hill tribes of the village saw the pilot and the co-pilot sitting with dark glasses in the helicopter, they believed they were Martians (Nyav-noj-neeg in Hmong). They also believed that the flying machine was a metal dragonfly. A few months later, the Vietnam War began and poisoned northern Xieng Khouang province. About three miles away, Lee Lue, a T-28 pilot employed by General Vang Pao and the US CIA, was killed. His T-28 aircraft was hit by a surface-to-air missile while he was conducting combat raids in Muang Soui. on July 12, 1969. He had been born a few miles from where he was killed.

The Vietnam War poisoned the entire north of Laos such as Battles of Nakhang,Samneua,Battle of Lima Site 85, Houaphanh Province, Viengxay caves areas, and Plain of Jars, Xiangkhouang province. In the Vietnam War, the Laotian civil war and the US Operation Off-Balance under General Vang Pao, North American T-28 Trojan and US Air Force fighters dropped thousands of bombs on this village. At the beginning of July 1969 American bombs destroyed this village. The villagers fled and eventually scattered around the world. The Hmong tribes abandoned the village in 1969, then hid. Some of the Yang families fled to Thailand, then immigrated to Western countries like Australia, Canada, France and the United States, for the most part after 1975. Most of these refugees settled in Minnesota, California, and also North Carolina.

Geography
The village of Ban Phou Pheung Noi is located between Sam Thong, Long Tieng, to the southeast,  Muang Soui to the north, Plain of Jars and Phonsavan to the east, and the royal capital Luang Prabang to the west and north.

The nearest neighboring villages are about three and five miles away. The three  villages are called San Luang (LS-41), Houei Ki Nin (LS-38), and Ban Pak Ha (LS-40) respectively. Ban Phou Pheung Noi is east of San Luang, and west of Houei Ki Nin. In administrative affairs, Ban Phou Pheung Noi depended on San Luang district, so Ban Phou Pheung Noi villagers received USAID food in 1969 through San Luang.

Climate
Laos is located on the equator, in the middle of Xieng Khouang province. Hence, the climate is tropical, often very hot and humid. There are two seasons in Ban Phou Pheung Noi: dry and rainy. The temperature is often high, between 20 and 32 Celsius, except during the dry season from November to February.

Demographics
In the early 1960s, Ban Phou Pheung Noi was a small village of 62 families with around 310 inhabitants. This census also included the Khmu population, the first natives, who arrived before the Hmong groups in Ban Phou Pheung Noi. The majority of the inhabitants were Hmong/Miao families, descendants of ChongBlia Yang. The others were from the Hmong Vang and Thao clans. These included three Vang families and two Thao families. Aside from the 47 Yang families, more than ten Khmu or Lao Theung families were not included with the Hmong families.

Miao/Hmong
The Miao/Hmong are from China, and about 70 different Miao/Hmong groups still live there. Most of these groups have very different customs and languages. They speak different languages; different groups don't intermarry and have different histories and ways of viewing themselves, changed over thousands of years. By ethnicity, there are the Hmong Be, Hmong Bua, Hmong Daw, Hmong Dle Nchab, Hmong Do, Hmong Don, Hmong Dou, Hmong Leng, Hmong Njua, Hmong Shua (sinized), Hmu, and some other Miao groups such as: Miao Bashi, Miao Chansu, Miao Chuan, Miao Enshi, Miao Guiyang Northern, Miao Guiyang Southern, Miao Guiyang Northwestern, Miao Guiyang Southwestern, Miao Guiyang South Central, Miao Horned, Miao Hua, Miao Huashi Central, Miao Huashi Eastern, Miao Huashi Northern, Miao Huashi Southwesthern, Miao Lipanshui, Miao Luobohe, Miao Marshan Central, Miao Marshan Northern, Miao Marshan Southern and Miao Marshan Western.

The Miao/Hmong who live in Laos and Vietnam have their own language and also their own culture. Each group speaks its own dialect and practices its own traditions and culture. Their clothing differs by group. Identifying a Hmong on the street today is not easy. Before, people did so when they spoke their dialect or wore traditional clothing. Three major Miao ethnic groups live in Southeast Asia, particularly in northern Phongsali and Xam Neua province; eastern Xiangkhouang, Oudomxay, Pakxan, and Khammouane province; western Luang Prabang, Vang Vieng, and Vientiane province. The first group is the White Hmong ethnic (Hmong Daw), the second one is the Green Hmong or Hmong Green  or Hmong Leng ethnic (Hmoob Leeg or Ntsuab), and the last one is the Black Hmong, Hmong Dou  ethnic (Hmoob Dub). There are also some small Hmong ethnic groups like Hmong multicolor (Hmoob Txaij) and Hmong qua npab. These are few.

ChongBlia Yang
ChongBlia Yang, a Laotian citizen born to Miao or Hmong ethnic parents from the Yang tribal clan, was the paternal root of the Yang families of Ban Phou Pheung Noi.

ChongBlia was born and raised in Xam Neua and Xieng Khouang Province. He died in the late 1890s a few kilometers from Phonsavan. His ancestors were Miao Hmong Daw, who came from southern China's Guizhou Province via Vietnam before settling in Laos in the 18th century. He had three sons. The eldest son was PajNus and the younger two were named NomPov and NtsuaLw Yang. Some of his descendants, especially Chong Lo Yang, Nhia Pao Yang of the fourth and fifth generations, joined the troops of general Vang Pao, an ally of the United States in the CIA's Secret War. At the time, they lived in Ban Phou Pheung Noi. After the Vietnam War, his descendants dispersed to the United States, Canada, Laos and France.

Education
In 1960, when Ban Phou Pheung Noi's first school was founded, the people of Ban Phou Pheung Noi were almost all illiterate. In the beginning, there were just over ten children and adolescents attending this primary school. But the number increased steadily thereafter.
 
The teacher at the time was KaYing Yang (Nao Ying Yang), a descendant of ChongBlia Yang who lived in Ban Phou Pheung Noi. Due to secondary school problems in Ban Phou Pheung Noi village, Sam Thong's Samthong College was the only middle high school where students could continue their education after primary school in Xiangkhouang province. After the Vietnam War of 1961-1975, this school was abandoned. As of 2021, although some of the children at this school are now over sixty years old, but some of them such as Doua Pao Yang are still alive in the United States, and are employed by Ramsey County, Minnesota and others in California.

Politics
In 1960, Kong Le's military troops headed east to Muang Soui and Phonsavan, Plain of Jars, after attempting to overthrow the royal government in Vientiane, and members of the Yang clan in Ban Phou Pheung Noi were recruited to join the government army in Ban Pangpang to monitor Kong Le's troops. During their first six months of service, they fought him near Muang Soui. When the Vietnam War started in 1961 in Xiangkhouang province, members of the clan in Ban Phou Pheung Noi joined General Vang Pao at the Battle of Ban Pa Dong (Ban Pa Dong). These soldiers were allies of the CIA in its secret war in Laos. Some were killed, injured or disabled. In 2021, some Yangs from the Secret War still lived in the United States, particularly Minnesota, California and North Carolina.

Economy
The Ban Phou Pheung Noi's households were farmers. The agriculture was mainly "hai or ray". The "ray or hai (in lao ໄຮ່ ຫຼື ໄຮ່) is a Laotian word which means rice acres in the mountain or valley. The rice exploitation is based on dense forests in the mountains or in the valleys. This agriculture was the core of the main economy of the villagers in Ban Phou Pheung Noi. People worked on the farms, while the younger ones, some were in the army with General Vang Pao. Household income depended mainly on rice, corn and opium at that time. Rice is the staple food that all families need every day. Farms of villagers were quite a distance from their homes. There was no transportation or car at the time. It all depended on each. In terms of animals, each family had about ten hens and roosters, then a few pigs. This intended for the needs of the family afterwards. Few people raised cows and oxen due to variety of family problems. In this village, there was no shops, nothing except the huts, it was only mountains and forests.

Social media
When the Vietnam War broke out, American black and white animated films in English arrived for the first time in Ban Phou Pheung Noi. It was by American humanitarian work team. At the time, there was a Hmong named "Xiong Nt". He was working for the US humanitarian aid program, especially with Pop Buell. Usually, the Hmong man came once per month by US military helicopters in Ban Phou Pheung Noi for taking care of the projection. The movies were shown primarily at night in full moon about life hygienic. How people got sick. How do people get malaria, fever and diarrhea? What were a drug, a doctor, and also a hospital?
 
In the meantime, since the animated film was funny, it made people, including children, laugh when they saw a mosquito bite a person and then put germs in their blood. Everyone laughed when the bacteria is roaming the human body. It was funny and then it made people laugh throughout the film without understanding the interest. For a Phou Pheung Noi's villager, western countries should be funny. No one knew what hygiene was at the end of the film. For the hill tribes, it was just a funny movie, nothing more.

Science/Technology and Religion
Not to mention science and technology, the hospital did not yet exist at the time in the countryside, especially in Ban Phou Pheung Noi and others. People didn't even know what a hospital and a doctor were. In Ban Phou Pheung Noi, when a family member of the hill tribes got sick, whatever cause is, people would go to the shamanist. A shamanist is called by the Hmong people a healer or a savior. It all comes from shamanism and it is called the Miao folk religion. From this belief, whatever reason and cause are, whether it was illness or injury, demons and deceased family members were involved.
 
 

Regarding technology, a villager of the Yang family, TongChao Yang, he could make rifles and powder cartridges by himself in Ban Phou Pheung Noi. He was an expert blacksmith of guns and jewelry, especially necklaces, earrings, rings, and also other household tool materials like axes, sickles, knives etc.

See also
Muang Soui
Sam Thong
Route 7 (Laos)

References

Populated places in Xiangkhouang Province
Vietnam War sites